Cyprus competed at the 2004 Summer Paralympics in Athens, Greece. The team included 5 athletes, 2 men and 3 women. Competitors from Cyprus won one gold medal to finish 57th in the medal table.

Medalists

Sports

Archery

|-
|align=left|Georgia Giagkoulla
|align=left|Women's individual W1/W2
|426
|15
|
|L 99-156
|colspan=4|did not advance
|}

Athletics

Swimming

Men

Women

See also
Cyprus at the Paralympics
Cyprus at the 2004 Summer Olympics

References 

Nations at the 2004 Summer Paralympics
2004
Summer Paralympics